Mad Dogs & Englishmen is a live album by Joe Cocker, released in 1970. The album's title is drawn from the 1931 Noël Coward song of the same name and Leon Russell's "Ballad of Mad Dogs and Englishmen". Only four songs of the 16 on the original album were drawn from his first two studio albums. Besides the contributions of bandmate and musical director Leon Russell, it draws equally from rock (the Rolling Stones, Traffic, Bob Dylan, the Beatles) and soul (Ray Charles, Sam & Dave, Otis Redding). Accompanying Cocker is a choir, a three-piece horn section and several drummers.

The single "The Letter"/"Space Captain", recorded during rehearsals was released to coincide with the tour. The album yielded the single "Cry Me a River"/"Give Peace a Chance." "Ballad of Mad Dogs and Englishmen"/"Let It Be" was a single from the movie soundtrack that featured Leon Russell and Claudia Lennear. The Leon Russell song was also released on his album Leon Russell and the Shelter People.

In 2005, Mad Dogs & Englishmen was released as a two-disc deluxe edition set through Universal Records to commemorate the album's 35th anniversary.

In 2006, Mad Dogs & Englishmen was released as a six-disc box set under the title Mad Dogs & Englishmen: The Complete Fillmore East Concerts by Hip-O Select. Both early and late shows from March 27 and 28, 1970, were released in their entirety.

Background
According to the liner notes, Cocker needed to put together a band quickly for a U.S. tour that his management had organized. He was informed only on 12 March 1970 about the tour which would start on 20 March. Russell recruited the musicians, many from his prior association with Delaney & Bonnie (Rita Coolidge, Carl Radle, Jim Price, Jim Horn, Jim Keltner and Jim Gordon). Chris Stainton was held over from Cocker's Grease Band and Cocker's producer Denny Cordell was part of the backing vocalists, as was Nicole Barclay of the band Fanny, and Claudia Lennear, the supposed subject of the Rolling Stones' hit, "Brown Sugar".

The tour was filmed, resulting in the theatrically-released concert film of the same name.

Reception 

Initially, Pete Nartez's review in Rolling Stone was generally negative, assessing that the album was "formed on a few days' notice to meet contractual obligations, and sounds like, well, like a group that was formed on a few days' notice to meet contractual obligations." He praised the tracks "Feelin' Alright," "Give Peace a Chance" and "Delta Lady," but criticized the majority of the arrangements and said the album lacks stylistic variety.

A more recent review of the box set in the same magazine was more positive, calling the band "a pickup orchestra with saloon-soul swagger."

In a retrospective review for AllMusic, Bruce Eder praised the album for the unique sound created by the unconventionally large rock band. He noted that Cocker's creative presence on the album was drowned out by that of Russell, but held that this was not a bad thing. Kevin Perry, writing Cocker's obituary in the NME, described the album as a classic and one of two things (the other his cover of "With a Little Help from My Friends") that first brought Cocker his fame.

Track listing

2005 deluxe edition
The two-disc deluxe edition expanded and re-sequenced the order of the original album to more closely reflect the actual order of the songs' presentation in concert. Introductions from the original album were matched with their corresponding songs, with about an hour of additional content, including songs with lead vocals performed by Leon Russell, Don Preston and Claudia Lennear as noted above. The new edition also added previously-released Cocker covers such as "Darling Be Home Soon", "Something" and "With a Little Help from My Friends".

Four bonus tracks that were not recorded in concert were included. One was a rehearsal jam. The single ("The Letter/"Space Captain"), recorded during rehearsals on a sound stage, that was released to coincide with the tour was also included. "The Ballad of Mad Dogs and Englishmen" was recorded by Russell later in 1970 and released on his Leon Russell and the Shelter People album in 1971.

Personnel 
Joe Cocker, Rita Coolidge, Donna Washburn, Claudia Lennear, Denny Cordell, Daniel Moore, Pamela Polland, Matthew Moore, Nicole Barclay, Bobby Jones - vocals
Leon Russell - lead guitar, piano, vocals, backing vocals
Don Preston - guitar, vocals, backing vocals
Chris Stainton - organ, piano
Carl Radle - bass guitar
Jim Gordon, Jim Keltner, Chuck Blackwell  - drums
Chuck Blackwell, Sandy Konikoff, Bobby Torres - percussion
Jim Horn, Bobby Keys - saxophone
Jim Price - trumpet

Technical
 Album cover photography: Jim McCrary
 Tour photographers: Andee Cohen, Linda Wolf

Chart performance

Certifications

References

External links
Tribute: Cocker Power
The Official Website of Joe Cocker
Photos taken by photographer Linda Wolf, one of the two official photographers of the Joe Cocker, Mad Dogs and Englishmen Tour, 1970

Albums produced by Denny Cordell
Live at the Fillmore East albums
A&M Records albums
A&M Records live albums
1970 live albums
Joe Cocker live albums
Albums produced by Leon Russell